In mathematics, a one-parameter group or one-parameter subgroup usually means a continuous group homomorphism

from the real line  (as an additive group) to some other topological group . 

One-parameter groups were introduced by Sophus Lie in 1893 to define infinitesimal transformations. According to Lie, an infinitesimal transformation is an infinitely small transformation of the one-parameter group that it generates. It is these infinitesimal transformations that generate a Lie algebra that is used to describe a Lie group of any dimension.

The action of a one-parameter group on a set is known as a flow. A smooth vector field on a manifold, at a point, induces a local flow - a one parameter group of local diffeomorphisms, sending points along integral curves of the vector field. The local flow of a vector field is used to define the Lie derivative of tensor fields along the vector field.

Examples
Such one-parameter groups are of basic importance in the theory of Lie groups, for which every element of the associated Lie algebra defines such a homomorphism, the exponential map. In the case of matrix groups it is given by the matrix exponential.

Another important case is seen in functional analysis, with  being the group of unitary operators on a Hilbert space. See Stone's theorem on one-parameter unitary groups.

In his 1957 monograph Lie Groups, P. M. Cohn gives the following theorem on page 58:

Physics
In physics, one-parameter groups describe dynamical systems. Furthermore, whenever a system of physical laws admits a one-parameter group of differentiable symmetries, then there is a conserved quantity, by Noether's theorem.

In the study of spacetime the use of the unit hyperbola to calibrate spatio-temporal measurements has become common since Hermann Minkowski discussed it in 1908. The principle of relativity was reduced to arbitrariness of which diameter of the unit hyperbola was used to determine a world-line. Using the parametrization of the hyperbola with hyperbolic angle, the theory of special relativity provided a calculus of relative motion with the one-parameter group indexed by rapidity. The rapidity replaces the velocity in kinematics and dynamics of relativity theory. Since rapidity is unbounded, the one-parameter group it stands upon is non-compact. The rapidity concept was introduced by E.T. Whittaker in 1910, and named by Alfred Robb the next year. The rapidity parameter amounts to the length of a hyperbolic versor, a concept of the nineteenth century.

In GL(n,ℂ)

An important example in the theory of Lie groups arises when  is taken to be , the group of invertible  matrices with complex entries. In that case, a basic result is the following:
Theorem: Suppose  is a one-parameter group. Then there exists a unique  matrix  such that

for all .
It follows from this result that  is differentiable, even though this was not an assumption of the theorem.
.
This result can be used, for example, to show that any continuous homomorphism between matrix Lie groups is smooth.

Topology

In that case the induced topology may not be the standard one of the real line.

See also 
 Integral curve
 One-parameter semigroup
 Noether's theorem

References
 .

Lie groups
1 (number)
Topological groups